Protein Complex Enrichment Analysis Tool is an online bioinformatics tool used to analyze high-throughput datasets (or small-scale datasets) using protein complex enrichment analysis. The tool uses a protein complex resource as the back end annotation data instead of conventional gene ontology- or pathway-based annotations. The tool incorporates several useful features in order to provide a comprehensive data-mining environment, including network-based visualization and interactive querying options.

COMPLEAT may be used to analyze RNAi screens, proteomic datasets, gene expression data and any other high-throughput datasets where protein complex information is relevant.

Applications
COMPLEAT has been successfully applied to identify:

Dynamic protein complexes regulated by insulin and epidermal growth factors signaling, including a role of Brahma complex in the cellular response to insulin.
Evolutionarily conserved molecular complexes that regulate nucleolar size when the complex constituents were targeted by RNA interference.
Novel role of endocytosis and vesicle trafficking complexes in Hippo Signaling Pathway.

References

External links
COMPLEAT

Data analysis software
Systems biology
Bioinformatics software